L. Frank & Son Building is a historic retail building located at Baltimore, Maryland, United States. It  is a four-story brick commercial building with a cast-iron façade, built about 1875.  It was constructed for Samuel Stein & Bros.,  and occupied by a dealer in iron ranges and furnaces, and later a series of shoe and clothing manufacturers.

L. Frank & Son Building was listed on the National Register of Historic Places in 1994. 
The building at 409 West Baltimore Street, next door, was listed at the same time.

References

External links
, including photo from 1986, at Maryland Historical Trust

Cast-iron architecture in Baltimore
Commercial buildings on the National Register of Historic Places in Baltimore
Commercial buildings completed in 1875
Downtown Baltimore